Olusegun Agagu University of Science and Technology (OAUSTECH) formally known as Ondo State University of Science and Technology (OSUSTECH) is a state owned university located in Okitipupa, Ondo State, Nigeria. It was established in 2008 by the Ondo State Government under the leadership of Dr. Olusegun Agagu. The university commenced academic activities in January 2011, and currently offers various programmes of study under the Faculty of Science, Faculty of Agriculture & Agricultural Technology and Faculty of Engineering and Engineering Technology.

The university was renamed after late former governor of Ondo State, Dr. Olusegun Agagu in 2020 in recognition of his immense role in the establishment of the institution.

In December 2020, the Ondo State Governor Oluwarotimi Akeredolu approved the appointment of Prof. Temi Emmanuel Ologunorisa as the next Vice Chancellor of the University, which took effect from 23 February 2022.

Ranking
The university emerged 9th in the National University Commission (NUC) ranking as one of the best 10 state-owned universities in Nigeria in 2021.

Faculties
The university commenced academic activities in January 2011, and offered various programmes of study under Faculty of Science.
In 2017, two new faculties were introduced which include: Faculty of Agriculture & Agricultural Technology and Faculty of Engineering and Engineering Technology.

The Faculty of Engineering has the following departments:

Mechanical engineering
Electrical engineering
Civil engineering

References

External links 
 

Universities and colleges in Ondo State
2010 establishments in Nigeria
Universities and colleges in Nigeria
Educational institutions established in 2010
Technological universities in Nigeria